The following is the qualification system for the Wrestling at the 2019 Pan American Games event, along with a list of qualified wrestlers per weight category.

Qualification system
A total of 150 wrestlers will qualify to compete at the games. The winner of each weight category at the 2018 South American Games and 2018 Central American and Caribbean Games and the top three at the 2018 Pan American Championships will qualify for the Games. The top three at the 2019 Pan American Championships also qualify. The host country (Peru) is guaranteed a spot in each event, but its athletes must compete in both the 2018 and 2019 Pan American Championship. If Peru has not qualified at the end of the 2019 Pan American Championships, the third spot available at the tournament will be awarded to Peru. A further six wildcards (four men and two women) will be awarded to nations without any qualified athlete but took part in the qualification tournaments.

Qualification timeline

Qualification summary
A total of 15 countries qualified wrestlers, with a further six receiving wild cards.

Men's freestyle events

57 kg

65 kg

74 kg

86 kg

97 kg

125 kg

Men's Greco-Roman events

60 kg

67 kg

77 kg

87 kg

97 kg

130 kg

Women's freestyle events

50 kg

53 kg

57 kg

62 kg

68 kg

76 kg

References

P
P
Qualification for the 2019 Pan American Games
Wrestling at the 2019 Pan American Games